K. Sattanatha Karayalar was an Indian politician and former Member of the Legislative Assembly. 
He was elected to Travancore-Cochin Legislative Assembly in 1952 and 1954 elections from Shenkottai constituency as an Independent candidate.

He was elected to the Tamil Nadu legislative assembly as an Independent candidate from Tenkasi constituency in 1957 election and from Tenkasi constituency as an Anna Dravida Munnetra Kazhagam candidate in  1980 election.

References 

All India Anna Dravida Munnetra Kazhagam politicians
Year of birth missing
Possibly living people
Travancore–Cochin MLAs 1952–1954
Travancore–Cochin MLAs 1954–1956
Madras MLAs 1952–1957
Tamil Nadu MLAs 1980–1984